Yeh Hsien-chung (born on 1 July 1979) is a Taiwanese football and futsal goalkeeper. Nicknamed Red Dragon, he is better known as his performance in futsal games. He has represented Taiwan in the 2004 Summer Olympics and AFC Futsal Championships. He has also been member of Tatung F.C. squad in AFC President's Cup 2006.

In 2009, Yeh became Taiwan's goalkeeping coach. However, in the 2010 East Asian Football Championship, Yeh participated as a player in Taiwan squad. He made his senior team debut in the game against Guam, in which Taiwan won 4–2, on 25 August 2009.

References

External links

1979 births
Living people
Futsal goalkeepers
Taiwanese footballers
Taiwanese men's futsal players
Tatung F.C. players
Association football goalkeepers
Chinese Taipei national football team managers